Warsaw II is a Polish parliamentary constituency in the Masovian Voivodeship.  It elects twelve members of the Sejm.

The district has the number '20' for elections to the Sejm, and is named after the country's capital city, Warsaw.  However, it does not include Warsaw itself, but covers the surrounding counties of Grodzisk Mazowiecki, Legionowo, Nowy Dwór, Otwock, Piaseczno, Pruszków, Warsaw West, and Wołomin.

List of members

2019-2023

Footnotes

Electoral districts of Poland
Masovian Voivodeship
Politics of Warsaw